7505 Furusho, provisional designation , is a stony asteroid and sizable Mars-crosser on an eccentric orbit from the asteroid belt, approximately  in diameter. It was discovered on 3 January 1997, by Japanese astronomer Takao Kobayashi at the Ōizumi Observatory in the Kantō region of Japan. The assumed S-type asteroid is likely elongated in shape and has a rotation period of 4.1 hours. It was named for Japanese astronomer .

Orbit and classification 

Furusho is a member of the Mars-crossing asteroids, a dynamically unstable group between the main belt and the near-Earth populations, crossing the orbit of Mars at 1.66 AU. It orbits the Sun at a distance of 1.6–3.6 AU once every 4 years and 3 months (1,563 days; semi-major axis of 2.64 AU). Its orbit has a high eccentricity of 0.38 and an inclination of 6° with respect to the ecliptic.

Naming 

This minor planet was named after Japanese astronomer Reiko Furusho (born 1970). Her research includes cometary physics, in particular the measurement of polarized light, caused by scattering on comet dust. Furusho also works in the education and popularization of astronomy. The official  was published by the Minor Planet Center on 1 May 2003.

Physical characteristics 

Furusho is an assumed S-type asteroid.

Rotation period 

In November 2017, a rotational lightcurve of Furusho was obtained from photometric observations by Daniel Klinglesmith at Etscorn Observatory  in Socorro, New Mexico. Lightcurve analysis gave a well-defined rotation period of  hours with a high brightness variation of 0.63 magnitude.

The result agrees with previous period determinations by Hungarian astronomers at Konkoly Observatory in autumn 2001, and with observations by astronomers at the Palomar Transient Factory in California in May 2011. Robert Stephens at Santana Observatory  and Brian Warner at the Palmer Divide Station  also determined an identical period in November 2001 and December 2013, respectively. All observations showed a classically shaped bimodal lightcurve with a high brightness amplitude between 0.52 and 0.75 magnitude, which is indicative of an elongated, non-spherical shape.

Diameter and albedo 

According to the survey carried out by the Infrared Astronomical Satellite IRAS, Furusho measures 9.07 kilometers in diameter and its surface has an albedo of 0.37. In 2017, a study dedicated to Mars-crossing asteroids by the NEOWISE mission of NASA's Wide-field Infrared Survey Explorer determined a diameter of 10.04 kilometers with an albedo of 0.21. The Collaborative Asteroid Lightcurve Link derives an albedo of 0.29 and a diameter of 8.9 kilometers based on an absolute magnitude of 12.20.

Sizable Mars-crosser 

With a diameter of 10 kilometers, Furusho is a typical "sizable" Mars-crosser (5–15 km) of which two dozens or so are known. These include 3581 Alvarez (13.7 km) 1065 Amundsenia (9.8 km), 1139 Atami (9.4 km), 3737 Beckman (14.4 km), 1474 Beira (15.5 km), 5682 Beresford (7.3 km), 7369 Gavrilin (5.5 km), 1011 Laodamia (7.4 km), 6170 Levasseur (5.7 km), 1727 Mette (5.4 km), 1131 Porzia (7.1 km), 985 Rosina (8.2 km), 1235 Schorria (5.6 km), 1310 Villigera (15.2 km), and 1468 Zomba (7 km), which are themselves smaller than the largest members of this dynamical group, namely, 132 Aethra, 323 Brucia (former Mars-crosser), 1508 Kemi, 2204 Lyyli and 512 Taurinensis, all larger than 20 kilometers.

Notes

References

External links 
 Asteroid 7505 Furusho, Small Bodies Data Ferret
 Asteroid Lightcurve Database (LCDB), query form (info )
 Dictionary of Minor Planet Names, Google books
 Discovery Circumstances: Numbered Minor Planets (5001)-(10000) – Minor Planet Center
 
 

007505
Discoveries by Takao Kobayashi
Named minor planets
19970103